

Fatty acid molecular species

Mono-unsaturated fatty acid 
The following fatty acids have one unsaturated bond.

Crotonic acid 
Crotonic acid has 4 carbons, is included in croton oil, and is a trans-2-mono-unsaturated fatty acid. C3H5 CO2H, IUPAC organization name (E)-but-2-enoic acid,  trans  -but-2-enoic acid, numerical representation 4: 1, n-1, molecular weight 86.09, melting point 72-74 °C, boiling point 180-181 °C, specific gravity 1.027. CAS registry number 107-93-7.

Myristoleic 
Myristoleic acid has 14 carbons, is found in whale blubber, and is a cis-9-monounsaturated fatty acid. C13H25CO2H, IUPAC organization name (Z)-tetradec-9-enoic acid, numerical representation 14:1, n-5, molecular weight 226.36, melting point of -4.5 -4 °C. CAS Registry Number 544-64-9.

Palmitoleic acid 
Palmitoleic acid has 16 carbons, is found in cod liver oil, sardine oil, and herring oil, and is a cis9-monounsaturated fatty acid. C15H29CO2H, IUPAC organization name (Z)-hexadec-9-enoic acid, n-7, numerical representation of 16: 1, molecular weight 254.41, melting point 5 °C, specific gravity 0.894. CAS Registry Number 373-49-9.

Sapienic acid 
Sapienic acid has 16 carbons, is found in the skin, and is a cis6-mono-unsaturated fatty acid. C15H29CO2H, IUPAC organization name (Z)-6-Hexadecenoic acid, n-10, numerical expression 16: 1, molecular weight 254.41. CAS Registry Number 17004-51-2.

Oleic acid 
Oleic acid has 18 carbons, is found in most animal fats and olive oil, and is a cis-9-monounsaturated fatty acid. C17H33CO2H, IUPAC organization name (Z)-octadec-9-enoic acid, numerical representation 18:1 (9), n-9, molecular weight 282.46, melting point 13.4 °C, specific gravity 0.891. CAS Registry Number 112-80-1.

Elaidic acid 
Elaidic acid has 18 carbons and is a trans-9-mono-unsaturated fatty acid. It is also a trans isomer of oleic acid. C17H33CO2H, IUPAC organization name (E)-octadec-9-enoic acid, numerical representation 18:1 (9), n-9, molecular weight 282.46, melting point 43-45 °C. CAS Registry Number 112-79-8.

Vaccenic acid 
Vaccenic acid has 18 carbons, is found in beef tallow, mutton, and butter, and is a trans11-mono-unsaturated fatty acid. C17H33CO2H, IUPAC organization name (E)-octadec-11-enoic acid, numerical representation 18:1 (11) n-7, molecular weight 282.46. CAS Registry Number 506-17-2.

Gadoleic acid 
Gadoleic acid has 20 carbons, is found in cod liver oil and other marine animal oils, and is a cis9-mono-unsaturated fatty acid. C19H37CO2H, IUPAC organization name (Z)-icos-9-enoic acid, numerical representation 20:1 (9), n-11, molecular weight 310.51. CAS Registry Number 29204-02-2.

Eicosenoic acid 
Eicosenoic acid has 20 carbons, is found in a wide variety of plant oils, and is a cis11-mono-unsaturated fatty acid. C19H37CO2H, IUPAC organization name (Z)-icos-11-enoic acid, numerical representation 20:1 (11), n-9, molecular weight 310.51. CAS Registry Number 5561-99-9.

Erucic acid 
Erucic acid has 22 carbons, is found in rapeseed oil and mustard oil, and is a cis13-monounsaturated is a fatty acid. C21H41CO2H, IUPAC organization name (Z)-docos-13-enoic acid, numerical representation 22:1, n-9, molecular weight 338.57, melting point 33-35 °C. CAS Registry Number 112-86-7.

Nervonic acid 
Nervonic acid has 24 carbons, is found in brain glycolipids (Nervon) and sphingomyelin, and is a cis15-mono-unsaturated fatty acid. C23H45CO2H, IUPAC organization name (Z)-tetracos-15-enoic acid, numerical representation 24:1, n-9, molecular weight 366.62, melting point 42-43 °C. CAS Registry Number 506-37-6.

Di-unsaturated fatty acid 
The following fatty acids have two unsaturated bonds.

Linoleic acid 
Linoleate has 18 carbons, is contained in many vegetable oils, particularly semi-drying oils, and is a cis-9-cis- 12-di-unsaturated fatty acid. C17H31CO2H, IUPAC organization name (9Z , 12Z)-octadeca- 9,12-dienoic acid, numerical representation 18: 2 (9,12), n-6, molecular weight 280.45, melting point -5 °C, specific gravity 0.902. CAS Registry Number 60-33-3. There is a double bond is conjugated as an isomer conjugated linoleic acid.

Eicosadienoic acid 
Eicosadienoic acid (eicosadienoic's) has 20 carbons and is a cis-11-cis14-di-unsaturated fatty acid. C19H35CO2H, IUPAC organization name (11Z , 14Z)-icosa- 11,14-dienoic acid, numerical representation 20: 2 (11,14), n-6, molecular weight 308.50.

Docosadienoic acid 
Docosadienoic acid (docosadienoic's) has 22 carbons and is a cis-13-cis16-di-unsaturated fatty acid. C21H39CO2H, IUPAC organization name (13Z , 16Z)-docosa- 13,16-dienoic acid, numerical representation 22: 2 (13,16), n-6, molecular weight 336.55. CAS Registry Number 7370-49-2.

Tri-unsaturated fatty acids 
The following fatty acids have three unsaturated bonds.

Linolenic acid 
α-linolenic acid (alpha-linolenic's) has 18 carbons, is found in linseed oil and drying oil, and is a 9,12,15-tri-unsaturated fatty acid. C17H29CO2H, IUPAC organization name (9Z , 12Z , 15  Z)-octadeca-9,12,15-trienoic acid, numerical representation 18: 3 (9,12,15), n-3, molecular weight 278.43, melting point -11 °C, specific gravity 0.914. CAS Registry Number 463-40-1.

γ-linolenic acid (gamma-linolenic's) has 18 carbons, the structural isomers of α- linolenic acid. IUPAC organization name (6Z , 9Z , 12Z)-octadeca-6,9,12-trienoic acid, numerical representation 18: 3 (6, 9, 12), n-6. CAS Registry Number 506-26-3.

Pinolenic acid 
Pinolenic acid (pinolenic's) has 18 carbons, is found in pine nuts, and is a 5,9,12-triunsaturated fatty acid. C17H29CO2H, IUPAC organization name (5Z , 9Z , 12  Z)-octadeca-5,9,12-trienoic acid, numerical representation 18: 3 (5,9,12), n-6, molecular weight 278.43. CAS Registry Number 16833-54-8.

Eleostearic acid 
α-eleostearic acid (alpha-eleostearic's) has 18 carbons, is found in Kiri drying oil, and is a 9,11,13-triunsaturated fatty acid. C17H29CO2H, IUPAC organization name (9E , 11E , 13  Z)-octadeca-9,11,13-trienoic acid, numerical representation 18: 3 (9,11,13), n-5, molecular weight 278.43.

β-eleostearic acid (beta-eleostearic's, beta-eleostearic acid) is a geometric isomer of α- eleostearic acid. IUPAC organization name (9E , 11E , 13E)-octadeca-9,11,13-trienoic acid, numerical representation 18: 3 (9, 11, 13), n-5.

Mead acid 
Mead acid (Mead's) has 20 carbons, is a 5,8,11-tri-unsaturated fatty acid. C19H33CO2H, IUPAC organization name (5Z , 8Z , 11  Z)-icosa-5,8,11-trienoic acid, numerical representation 20: 3 (5,8,11), n-9, molecular weight 306.48. CAS Registry Number 20590-32-3.

Dihomo-γ-linolenic acid 
Dihomo-γ-linolenic acid (dihomo-gamma-linolenic's, dihomo-gamma-linolenic acid, DGLA) has 20 carbons, and is an 8,11,14-tri-unsaturated fatty acid. C19H33CO2H, IUPAC organization name (8Z , 11Z , 14  Z)-icosa-8,11,14-trienoic acid, numerical representation 20: 3 (8,11,14), n-6, molecular weight 306.48. CAS Registry Number 1783-84-2.

Eicosatrienoic acid 
Eicosatrienoic acid (eicosatrienoic's, eicosatrienoic acid) has 20 carbons and is an 11,14,17- tri unsaturated fatty acid. C19H33CO2H, IUPAC organization name (11Z , 14Z , 17  Z)-icosa-11,14,17-trienoic acid, numerical representation 20: 3 (11,14,17), n-3, molecular weight 306.48.

Tetra-unsaturated fatty acids 
The following fatty acids have four unsaturated bonds.

Stearidonic acid 
Stearidonic acid (stearidonic's) has 18 carbons, is found in sardine oil and herring oil, and is a 6,9,12,15-tetraunsaturated fatty acid. C17H27CO2H, IUPAC organization name (6Z , 9Z , 12  Z , 15Z)-octadeca-6,9,12,15-tetraenoic acid, numerical representation 18: 4 (6,9,12,15), n-3, molecular weight 276.41. CAS Registry Number 20290-75-9.

Arachidonic acid 
Arachidonic acid (arachidonic's) has 20 carbons, is present in animal visceral fat (brain, liver, kidney, lung, spleen), and is a 5,8,11,14-tetra-unsaturated fatty acid. C19H31CO2H, IUPAC organization name (5Z , 8Z , 11  Z , 14Z)-icosa-5,8,11,14-tetraenoic acid, numerical representation 20: 4 (5,8,11,14), n-6, molecular weight 304.47, boiling point 169- 171 °C. CAS Registry Number 506-32-1.

In signal transduction, arachidonic acid is produced through decomposition of the phospholipid cell membrane. This gives rise to the arachidonic acid cascade, a metabolic pathway that yields lipid mediator compounds such as prostaglandins, thromboxanes and leukotrienes. This pathway has attracted study for its key role in inflammatory diseases such as asthma.

Eicosatetraenoic acid 
Eicosatetraenoic acid (eicosatetraenoic's) has 20 carbons and is an 8,11,14,17-tetraunsaturated fatty acid. C19H31CO2H, IUPAC organization name (8Z , 11Z , 14  Z , 17Z)-icosa-8,11,14,17-tetraenoic acid, numerical representation 20: 4 (8,11,14,17), n-3, molecular weight 304.47.

Adrenic acid 
Adrenic acid (adrenic'sd) has 22 carbons and is a 7,10,13,16-tetra-unsaturated fatty acid. C21H35CO2H, IUPAC organization name (7Z , 10Z , 13  Z , 16Z)-docosa-7,10,13,16-tetraenoic acid, numerical representation 22: 4 (7,10,13,16), n-6, molecular weight 332.52. CAS Registry Number 28874-58-0.

Pentaunsaturated fatty acids 
The following fatty acids have five unsaturated bonds.

Bosseopentaenoic acid 
Bosseopentaenoic acid (Boseopentaen's), has 20 carbons and is a 5,8,10,12,14-pentaunsaturated fatty acid. C17H25CO2H, IUPAC organization name (5Z , 8Z , 10  E , 12E , 14Z)-eicosa-5,8,10,12,14-pentaenoic acid, numerical representation 20: 5 (5,8,10,12,14), n-6, molecular weight 302.46 g·mol−1.

Eicosapentaenoic acid 
Eicosapentaenoic acid (EPA) has 20 carbons, is found in fish oil, is a pentaunsaturated fatty acid. It is one of the essential fatty acids. The recommendation of ingesting fish oil supplements during pregnancy is said to help increase the cognitive ability at 6 months, but mercury concentration in fish products offsets the effect. In patients with hyperlipidemia and obstructive artery disease it can help lower triglycerides and also has an anti-platelet effect similar to other anti-platelet agents. It has also been shown to help in secondary prevention of ischemic heart disease as shown with the  JELIS test.

C19H29CO2H, IUPAC organization name (5Z , 8Z , 11  Z , 14Z , 17Z)-icosa-5,8,11,14,17-pentaenoic acid, numerical representation of 20: 5 (5,8,11,14,17), n-3, molecular weight 302.45, from melting point -54 -53 °C, specific gravity 0.943. CAS Registry Number 10417-94-4.

Ozubondo acid 
Ozubondo acid (Ozubondo's, Osbond acid), has 22 carbons, is a 4,7,10,13,16- pentaunsaturated fatty acid. C21H33CO2H, IUPAC organization name (4Z , 7Z , 10Z , 13Z , 16Z)-docosa-4,7,10,13,16-pentaenoic acid, numerical representation 22: 5 (4,7,10,13,16), n-6, molecular weight 330.50. CAS Registry Number 25182-74-5

Sardine acid 
Sardine acid (Clupanodonic acid) has 22 carbons, is found in sardine oil and herring oil, is a 7,10,13,16,19- pentaunsaturated fatty acid. C21H33CO2H, IUPAC organization name (7Z , 10Z , 13  Z , 16Z , 19Z)-docosa-7,10,13,16,19-pentaenoic acid, numerical representation 22: 5 (7,10,13,16,19), n-3, molecular weight 330.50.

Tetracosanolpentaenoic acid 
Tetracosanolpentaenoic acid has 24 carbons, is a 9,12,15,18,21-penta unsaturated fatty acid. C23H37CO2H, IUPAC organization name (9Z , 12Z , 15  Z , 18Z , 21Z)-tetracosa-9,12,15,18,21-pentaenoic acid, numerical representation 24: 5 (9,12,15,18,21), n-3, molecular weight 358.56.

Hexa-unsaturated fatty acids 
The following fatty acids have six unsaturated bonds.

Cervonic acid 
Cervonic acid (or docosahexaenoic acid) has 22 carbons, is found in fish oil, is a 4,7,10,13,16,19-hexa unsaturated fatty acid. In the human body its generation depends on consumption of omega 3 essential fatty acids (e.g., ALA or EPA), but the conversion process is inefficient. C21H31CO2H, IUPAC organization name (4Z, 7Z, 10Z, 13Z, 16Z, 19Z)-docosa-4,7,10,13,16,19-hexaenoic acid, numerical representation 22: 6 (4, 7,10,13,16,19), n-3, molecular weight 328.49, melting point -44 °C, specific gravity 0.950. CAS Registry Number 6217-54-5.

Herring acid 
Herring acid (Herring's, Nisinic acid) is a 6,9,12,15,18,21-hexa unsaturated fatty acid with 24 carbon atoms. C23H35CO2H, IUPAC organization name (6Z , 9Z , 12  Z , 15Z , 18Z , 21Z)-tetracosa-6,9,12,15,18,21-hexaenoic acid, numerical representation 24: 6 (6, 9,12,15,18,21), n-3, molecular weight 356.54.

See also
List of saturated fatty acids
Carboxylic acid
List of carboxylic acids
Dicarboxylic acid

References

 
Unsaturated Fatty Acids
Alkenoic acids